Pan pizza is a pizza baked in a deep dish pan or sheet pan. Italian tomato pie, Sicilian pizza, Chicago-style pizza and Detroit-style pizza may be considered forms of pan pizza. Pan pizza also refers to the thick style popularized by Pizza Hut in the 1960s. The bottoms and sides of the crust become fried and crispy in the oil used to coat the pan.

History
Dan and Frank Carney opened a pizza parlor in Wichita, Kansas which would later become Pizza Hut. At first, the brothers focused on a thin crust pizza which included cheese, pepperoni, and/or sausage. The pizza parlor franchised into Pizza Hut in 1959 and added a thicker crust pan pizza.

Other pizza companies also later included pan pizza. In 1989, Domino's Pizza introduced its deep dish or pan pizza. Its introduction followed market research showing that 40% of pizza customers preferred thick crusts. The new product launch cost approximately $25 million, of which $15 million was spent on new sheet metal pans with perforated bottoms.

See also

 Detroit-style pizza
 Chicago-style pizza
 Pizza in the United States
 List of tomato dishes
 Stuffed crust pizza

References

Italian-American cuisine
Tomato dishes
Pizza styles